Kingsley Cavell is a retired Australian chemist who was professor of inorganic chemistry and head of the
School of Chemistry at Cardiff University.  His research interests include the design and synthesis of novel heterocyclic carbenes, and functionalised derivatives as ligands in transition metal complexes.

References

External links
 Published articles by Kingsley Cavell listed on Google Scholar

1946 births
Living people
Australian chemists
Academics of Cardiff University